Augusto Alejandro José González (born 13 August 1980), known professionally as Álex González, is a Spanish actor.

Biography 
He was born on 13 August 1980 in Madrid. After González starred in short films and played a minor role in Hospital Central, his TV career took off with Un paso adelante, where he played the role of UFO.

Filmography 

Television

Films

References

External links
 

1980 births
Living people
Male actors from Madrid
Spanish male film actors
Spanish male television actors